Saint-Thibaut is a former commune in the Aisne department in Hauts-de-France in northern France. On 1 January 2022, it was merged into the new commune of Bazoches-et-Saint-Thibaut.

Saint-Thibaut (abbreviated on local signage as St.-Thibaut) was the site of heavy fighting between American and German troops during the Vesle campaign (July–August 1918) of World War I.

Population

See also
 Communes of the Aisne department

References

Former communes of Aisne
Aisne communes articles needing translation from French Wikipedia